Medvedki is the name of several  rural localities in Russia.

Arkhangelsk Oblast
As of 2022, one rural locality in Arkhangelsk Oblast bears this name:
Medvedki, Arkhangelsk Oblast, a village in Votlazhemsky Selsoviet of Kotlassky District

Ivanovo Oblast
As of 2022, one rural locality in Ivanovo Oblast bears this name:
Medvedki, Ivanovo Oblast, a village in Puchezhsky District

Kaluga Oblast
As of 2022, one rural locality in Kaluga Oblast bears this name:
Medvedki, Kaluga Oblast, a village in Meshchovsky District

Kostroma Oblast
As of 2022, four rural localities in Kostroma Oblast bear this name:
Medvedki, Ostrovsky District, Kostroma Oblast, a village in Klevantsovskoye Settlement of Ostrovsky District
Medvedki, Severnoye Settlement, Susaninsky District, Kostroma Oblast, a village in Severnoye Settlement of Susaninsky District
Medvedki, Severnoye Settlement, Susaninsky District, Kostroma Oblast, a village in Severnoye Settlement of Susaninsky District
Medvedki, Sumarokovskoye Settlement, Susaninsky District, Kostroma Oblast, a village in Sumarokovskoye Settlement of Susaninsky District

Moscow Oblast
As of 2022, two rural localities in Moscow Oblast bear this name:
Medvedki, Istrinsky District, Moscow Oblast, a village in Yadrominskoye Rural Settlement of Istrinsky District
Medvedki, Volokolamsky District, Moscow Oblast, a village in Ostashevskoye Rural Settlement of Volokolamsky District

Oryol Oblast
As of 2022, one rural locality in Oryol Oblast bears this name:
Medvedki, Oryol Oblast, a village in Medvedkovsky Selsoviet of Bolkhovsky District

Smolensk Oblast
As of 2022, five rural localities in Smolensk Oblast bear this name:
Medvedki, Demidovsky District, Smolensk Oblast, a village under the administrative jurisdiction of Demidovskoye Urban Settlement of Demidovsky District
Medvedki, Kholm-Zhirkovsky District, Smolensk Oblast, a village in Tupikovskoye Rural Settlement of Kholm-Zhirkovsky District
Medvedki, Novoduginsky District, Smolensk Oblast, a village in Izvekovskoye Rural Settlement of Novoduginsky District
Medvedki, Sychyovsky District, Smolensk Oblast, a village in Bekhteyevskoye Rural Settlement of Sychyovsky District
Medvedki, Ugransky District, Smolensk Oblast, a village in Rusanovskoye Rural Settlement of Ugransky District

Tula Oblast
As of 2022, three rural localities in Tula Oblast bear this name:
Medvedki, Chernsky District, Tula Oblast, a village in Fedorovskaya Rural Administration of Chernsky District
Medvedki, Leninsky District, Tula Oblast, a selo in Aleshinsky Rural Okrug of Leninsky District
Medvedki, Venyovsky District, Tula Oblast, a selo in Gatsky Rural Okrug of Venyovsky District

Vologda Oblast
As of 2022, one rural locality in Vologda Oblast bears this name:
Medvedki, Vologda Oblast, a village in Krasavinsky Selsoviet of Velikoustyugsky District

Yaroslavl Oblast
As of 2022, two rural localities in Yaroslavl Oblast bear this name:
Medvedki, Danilovsky District, Yaroslavl Oblast, a village in Shagotsky Rural Okrug of Danilovsky District
Medvedki, Tutayevsky District, Yaroslavl Oblast, a village in Metenininsky Rural Okrug of Tutayevsky District